This List of rail trails in Washington lists former railroad right-of-ways in Washington state that have been converted to rail trails for public use, or rail corridors where rails coexist with trails, Rails with Trails.

Western Washington

 Burke Gilman Trail - Seattle and suburbs
 Cascade Trail - Skagit County
 Cedar River Trail - King County
 Cedar to Green River Trail - King County
 Centennial Trail - Snohomish County
 Chehalis Western Trail - Thurston County
 Cross Kirkland Corridor - King County
 East Lake Sammamish Trail - King County
 Eastside Rail Corridor - King County
 Foothills Trail - Pierce County
 Gate to Belmore Trail - Thurston County
 Interurban Trail (King County) - King County  
 Interurban Trail (Snohomish County) - Snohomish County
 Interurban Trail (Whatcom County) - Bellingham & Whatcom County
 Issaquah-Preston Trail and Preston-Snoqualmie Trail - eastern King County
 Olympic Discovery Trail
 Sammamish River Trail - King County
 Snoqualmie Valley Regional Trail - King County
 Whitehorse Trail - Snohomish County - ties into the Centennial Trail
 Willapa Hills Trail - Chehalis to South Bend
 Yelm-Rainier-Tenino Trail - Thurston County

Cross-Cascades
 Iron Horse State Park - also known as the "Iron Horse Trail" and John Wayne Pioneer Trail which continues east from Vantage

Eastern Washington
 Bill Chipman Palouse Trail in Whitman County connects Pullman, Washington, with Moscow, Idaho, in the Palouse region
 Columbia Plateau Trail - Spokane to Pasco; Spokane city segment known as Fish Lake Trail
 Ferry County Rail Trail - Republic to Canada–US border at Danville
 Palouse to Cascades State Park Trail - formerly John Wayne Pioneer Trail, extends from the Idaho border to the western slopes of the Cascade Mountains 
 Klickitat Trail - Klickitat County
 Spokane River Centennial Trail - Spokane

References

Rail trails
rail trails in Washington